The Federal University of Itajubá (UNIFEI; formerly known as the , EFEI), is a federal university located in the state of Minas Gerais, Brazil. It is considered the first technological university and one of top ten engineering schools in Brazil. Extremely reputable among Brazilian engineering schools, it carries more than 100 years of tradition in teaching, with emphasis on Electrical Engineering – which is one of the best research institutes on Power Systems field in Latin America – Mechanical Engineering, Environmental Engineering, Materials Engineering, Automation and Control engineering and Computer Engineering.

History
The university was founded on November 23, 1913, as the Instituto Eletrotécnico e Mecânico de Itajubá (IEMI). On April 16, 1968, the university changed its name to Escola Federal de Engenharia de Itajubá (Itajubá Federal Engineering School). In 2002, it earned the title of University, and was renamed as Universidade Federal de Itajubá (Itajubá Federal University), by the Brazilian Law 10,435, approved by the former president, Fernando Henrique Cardoso. The university is considered to be one of the best universities of Brazil, according to the ranks published by the Ministério da Educação e Cultura - MEC (Culture and Education Ministry). It was elected in 2009 one of the top ten universities in Brazil by two different rankings, occupying the first position in one of them. In the IGC/2011 (College and Universities Evaluation) by MEC (Ministry of Education), the Itajubá Federal University  obtained the grade 5, maximum, being among the best 27 higher-education colleges and among the top 10 universities of the country.

Radio station
The university owns and operates its own AM radio station, called Rádio Universitária 1570 kHz (University Radio) ZYL-242, operating in the 1570 kHz band since early 1961.

International partnerships

Austria 
  Montanuniversitat Leoben

Belgium 
  Haute Ecole Provinciale de Hainaut Condorcet

Bolivia 
  UAGRM - Universidad Autónoma Gabriel René Moreno

Canada 
  University of British Columbia
  University of Victoria
  University of Windsor

Chile 
  Universidad de Talca

Colombia 
  Universidad Distrital Francisco José de Caldas
  Universidad Autónoma Del Caribe
  Universidad Autónoma de Colombia
  Universidad de La Costa
  Universidad de Los Andes
  Universidad de Santander

Cuba 
  Instituto Superior Politécnico José Antonio Echeverría

Denmark 
  Aalborg University

France 
  Polytech Lille
  ISAT - Institut Supérieur de l'Automobile et des Transports
  ISAE - Institut Supérieur de l'Aéronautique et de l'Espace 
  ENSAM - École Nationale Superieure d'Arts et métiers
  École Nationale Supérieure des Mines de Nancy
  UTC - Université de Technologie de Compiègne
  UTT - Université de Technologie de Troyes 
  ENIM - École Nationale d'Ingénieurs de Metz
  ENIT - École Nationale d'Ingénieurs de Tarbes
  ENISE - École nationale d'ingénieurs de Saint-Étienne
  ENIB - École Nationale d'Ingénieurs de Brest
  ENGEES - École Nationale du Génie de l'Eau et de l'Environnement de Strasbourg
  Supinfo International University
  Université de Versailles Saint-Quentin-En-Yvelines
  CNAM - Conservatoire National d'Arts et Métiers
  Université d'Orleans
  Cátedras Francesas
  CentraleSupélec 
  ENSMA - École Nationale Supérieure de Mécanique et d'Aérotechnique

Germany 
  Hochschule Weihenstephan Triesdorf
  TU Dresden - Technische Universität Dresden
  Otto Von Guericke Universität Magdeburg

India 
  Indian Institute of Technology Roorkee

Netherlands 
  TU Eindhoven - Universidade Tecnológica de Eindhoven

Portugal 
  Universidade do Algarve
  INESC
  Universidade de Lisboa
  Universidades Lusíada 
  Universidade do Porto
  INESC TEC - Instituto de Engenharia de Sistemas e Computadores, Tecnologia e Ciência

South Korea 
  Korea Energy Economics Institute (KEEI)

Spain 
  Universidad de Granada
  Universidad de Santiago de Compostela
  Universidade Carlos III de Madrid

United States 
  Washington State University

Uruguay 
  Universidad de La República

See also
 Itajubá

References

External links

 
 High Voltage Laboratory LAT-EFEI
 Rádio Universitária AM - University Radio

Educational institutions established in 1913
1913 establishments in Brazil
Universities and colleges in Minas Gerais
Federal universities of Brazil